Eero Antero Mäntyranta (20 November 1937 – 29 December 2013) was one of the most successful Finnish cross-country skiers. He competed in four Winter Olympics (1960–1972) winning seven medals at three of them. His performance at the 1964 Winter Olympics earned him the nickname "Mister Seefeld", referring to the venue where the cross-country skiing and biathlon competitions took place. The Finnish Ministry of Education endowed him with the Pro Urheilu letter of recognition in 2000. There is also a museum centered on Mäntyranta in his birthplace of Pello.

Genetics and doping

Mäntyranta had primary familial and congenital polycythemia (PFCP) causing an increase in red blood cell mass and hemoglobin due to a mutation in the erythropoietin receptor (EPOR) gene, which was identified following a DNA study that found the mutation in a high proportion of members of his extended family, as reported in 1993. The elevated hematocrit caused by the condition increases the ability of the blood to transport oxygen; the EPOR mutation is speculated to have contributed to Mäntyranta's remarkable endurance.

In 1972 Mäntyranta tested positive for amphetamine at a Finnish competition, becoming the first of his countrymen known to be caught doping. He later admitted taking hormones, which were not yet prohibited.

Cross-country skiing results
All results are sourced from the International Ski Federation (FIS).

Olympic Games
 7 medals – (3 gold, 2 silver, 2 bronze)

World Championships
 5 medals – (2 gold, 2 silver, 1 bronze)

Accomplishments 
 National domestic championships: five gold, two silver and two bronze
 Holmenkollen ski festival championships first place 1962, 1964 and 1968 (15 km)
 Holmenkollen medal in 1964 (Shared with Veikko Kankkonen, Georg Thoma, and Halvor Næs.).
 Salpausselkä games win 1964 and 1972.

See also
Athletes of Finland
Olympic Athletes of Finland

References

External links

 
 Holmenkollen medalists – click Holmenkollmedaljen for downloadable pdf file 
 Holmenkollen winners since 1892 – click Vinnere for downloadable pdf file 

1937 births
2013 deaths
People from Pello
Cross-country skiers at the 1960 Winter Olympics
Cross-country skiers at the 1964 Winter Olympics
Cross-country skiers at the 1968 Winter Olympics
Cross-country skiers at the 1972 Winter Olympics
Doping cases in cross-country skiing
Finnish male cross-country skiers
Finnish sportspeople in doping cases
Holmenkollen medalists
Holmenkollen Ski Festival winners
Olympic gold medalists for Finland
Olympic silver medalists for Finland
Olympic bronze medalists for Finland
Olympic medalists in cross-country skiing
Olympic cross-country skiers of Finland
FIS Nordic World Ski Championships medalists in cross-country skiing
Medalists at the 1960 Winter Olympics
Medalists at the 1964 Winter Olympics
Medalists at the 1968 Winter Olympics
Sportspeople from Lapland (Finland)